Snyder station is a rapid transit passenger rail station on SEPTA's Broad Street Line in South Philadelphia, Pennsylvania. It is located at 2100 South Broad Street (PA 611) in the Lower Moyamensing neighborhood and is named for Snyder Avenue.

Originally built in 1938, Snyder station was the southern terminus of the Broad Street Line until 1973, when it was extended to Pattison Station (now named NRG station). A connection exists to the never-built Passyunk Avenue Spur. South Philadelphia High School and the Methodist Hospital are located near the station.

Station layout 
There are four street entrances to the station, one at each corner of the intersection between Broad Street and Snyder Avenue. The southwest entrance has a covered canopy and is an exit-only staircase.

Gallery

References

External links 

 

SEPTA Broad Street Line stations
Railway stations in the United States opened in 1938
Railway stations in Philadelphia
Railway stations located underground in Pennsylvania